Cappeln is a municipality in the district of Cloppenburg, in Lower Saxony, Germany. It is situated approximately 7 km southeast of Cloppenburg.

Cappeln consists of the following rural communities:

 Cappeln including Dingel
 Tenstedt including Siehenfelde, Osterhausen, Darrenkamp and Gut Schwede
 Schwichteler with Nordenbrok and Schwichteler station
 Bokel with Wißmühlen
 Mintewede
 Elsten and Elstermoor
 Sevelten
 Warnstedt
 Nutteln/Tegelrieden

History 

In 1159 Cappeln became independent from nearby Emstek and founded its own parish. The name derives from the word "chapel". The old church (built in 1150) was only demolished in 1900 to make room for the current St. Peter and Paul church.

From 1914 to 1965 a local railway linked Cappeln to Cloppenburg and Vechta, first the only station was in Schwichtler.

Sons and daughters 
 Günter Dreyer (1943-2019), German egyptologist

Architecture 

  St. Peter und Paul's Church
 Pastorat, built in 1711
 Stud farm Vorwerk
 St. Mary's Church (Sevelten)
 Saint Francis of Assisi Church (Elsten)

References 

Cloppenburg (district)